The 2022–23 season is the 121st season of competitive football in Italy.

National teams

Men

Italy national football team

Friendlies

UEFA Nations League

Group 3

2023 UEFA Nations League Finals

UEFA Euro 2024 qualifying

Group C

Women

Italy women's national football team

Friendlies

UEFA Women's Euro

Group D

2023 FIFA Women's World Cup qualification

Group G

2023 Arnold Clark Cup

League season

Men

Promotions and relegations (pre-season)
Teams promoted to Serie A
Lecce
Cremonese
Monza

Teams relegated from Serie A
Cagliari
Genoa
Venezia

Teams promoted to Serie B
Südtirol (Group A)
Modena (Group B)
Bari (Group C)

Teams relegated from Serie B
Vicenza
Alessandria
Crotone
Pordenone

Serie A

Serie B

Serie C

Serie D

Women

Serie A (women)

Cup competitions

Coppa Italia

Final

Supercoppa Italiana

Coppa Italia Serie C

Coppa Italia Serie D

Coppa Italia (women)

Final

Supercoppa Italiana (women)

Final

UEFA competitions

UEFA Champions League

Group stage

Group A

Group C

Group E

Group H

Knockout phase

Round of 16

|}

Quarter-finals

|}
Notes

Semi-finals

|}

UEFA Europa League

Group stage

Group C

Group F

Knockout stage

Knockout round play-offs

|}

Round of 16 

|}

Quarter-finals 

|}

UEFA Europa Conference League

Qualifying phase and play-off round

Play-off round

|}

Group stage

Group A

Knockout stage

Knockout round play-offs 

|}

Round of 16

|}

Quarter-finals

|}

UEFA Youth League

UEFA Champions League Path

Group stage

Group A

Group C

Group E

Group H

Knockout Phase

Play-offs

|}

Round of 16

|}

Quarter-finals

|}

Semi-finals

|}

UEFA Women's Champions League

Qualifying rounds

Round 1

Semi-finals

|}

Final

|}

Round 2

|}

Group stage

Group B

Group C

Knockout phase

Quarter-finals

|}

Notes

References 

 
Seasons in Italian football
Football
Football
Italy
Italy
2022 sport-related lists